Broadcasters for the New Orleans Pelicans and New Orleans Hornets National Basketball Association team.

Television

2010s

2000s

Radio

2010s

2000s

Notes
 From 1999 to 2002, the Hornets' three color commentators rotated between television and radio. One would call the game on television and the other two would do the game on radio.

References

See also 
 List of current National Basketball Association broadcasters

Broadcasters
New Orleans Pelicans
Fox Sports Networks
Bally Sports